Ritscher is a surname. Notable people with the surname include:

 Alfred Ritscher (1879–1963), German polar explorer
 Karen Ritscher, American violist and academic
 Malachi Ritscher (1954–2006), American musician, recording engineer, human rights activist, and anti-war protester
 Simone Ritscher (born 1959), German actress